Bogdan Romuald Tuszyński (4 July 1932 – 1 January 2017) was a Polish sports journalist, reporter and historian. He was best known for his sports report Studio S-13 of the Polskie Radio, beginning in 1970. Born in Łódź, he began his career as an editor of Przegląd Sportowy (1951–1952), before moving to Polskie Radio in 1953, departing from the radio broadcaster in 1981. He also reported on the Peace Race annually. He published approximately thirty books between 1975 and 2009.

For his services to Polish sports journalist, Tuszyński was awarded the Order of Polonia Restituta and the Cross of Merit.

Tuszyński died following a long illness on 1 January 2017 in Warsaw at the age of 84.

References

1932 births
2017 deaths
Writers from Łódź
Polish radio journalists
Polish reporters and correspondents
Recipients of the Order of Polonia Restituta (1944–1989)
Sports historians
Polish sports journalists